"Manos al Aire" is a Spanish-language song by Canadian singer-songwriter Nelly Furtado. Written by Furtado, Alex Cuba and James Bryan, it was produced by Furtado and Bryan for the former's fourth studio album, Mi Plan (2009). The song, which translates to "Hands up" or "I surrender", is about "surrendering to love, and vulnerability", as Furtado put it. She felt that the song could only be sung in Spanish because it would be a "train-wreck" if it were sung in English because of the complexity of the lyrics.

It was released by Nelstar Entertainment and Universal Music Latino as the first single to worldwide radio on June 29, 2009. "Manos al Aire" reached number-one on the US Billboard Latin Songs chart, becoming Furtado's first number-one song on the chart as a lead artist. Furtado also became the first North American act to have an originally written Spanish song to reach number-one on the chart. It peaked at number two in Germany, Czech Republic and Italy. It also peaked within the top 10 in Austria, Hungary, Switzerland and Spain. The music video of the song was filmed in Toronto and it portrayed Furtado as an angry lover who, during the video, throws away personal belongings and items, and removing articles of clothing which symbolizes her letting her guard down and surrendering to love. The song won a BMI Award in 2011.

Background and writing
"Manos al Aire" was co-written by Nelly Furtado, James Bryan and Alex Cuba, and produced by Furtado and Bryan. It is a Latin pop song with "a slice of pop/rock with twangy guitars, tight drums and terrific breathy vocals" and has acoustic and dance influences The song's title translates to "Hands in the Air" or "I Surrender". Furtado told MTV that the song is about "surrendering to love, and vulnerability ... and it talks about the dynamic of a relationship and the everyday fight to be a couple". Furtado felt that the emotions that the lyrics portray could only be expressed in Spanish because, as she put it: "There's a complexity going on there that would be a bit of a train-wreck in English." In an interview with Mayor Nissim, of Digital Spy, she further explained the conception of the song. She said that the song's protagonist feels angry but during the chorus says, as she put it, "My hands are in the air, let's work this out". Furtado also felt that if the song was performed in English, she would be labelled "furious or sappy" because of the content. It was recorded by Bryan at the Rumblecone Studios and The Orange Lounge in Toronto, Ontario, Canada, and mixed by Demacio "Demo" Castellón.

Critical reception
Mayer Nissim of Digital Spy said: "the fact that 'Manos' and several other songs feature rather Americanised production can prevent them from completely hitting the mark - sad to say, but Furtado's tunes don't always get the Spanish wallop her vocals deserve." Leila Cobo stated that the song "doesn't set the tone for the album, which balances intimacy with commercial appeal."

Michael Cragg, of musicOMH, called the song "a catchy blend of rock guitars and pattering beats". He also wrote that the chorus-line is "one of the few that genuinely stick in the mind".

Chart performance
The single was well received in the United States. During its third week on the Billboard  Hot Latin Songs chart, it ascended from number 30 to number 13. After two weeks at number two, "Manos al Aire" replaced Shakira's "Loba" at number-one the Billboard Latin Songs chart, during the week dated September 12, 2009. It became Furtado's first number one song as a lead artist, and her second since Juanes' "Fotografía" topped the chart in 2002. Shakira's "Loba" had regained its place at number-one, ending the song's four week stint at the top spot.

In Italy, "Manos al Aire" debuted at number two and remained at the spot for two consecutive weeks. After it fluctuated down the chart, it climbed up back into the top 10 and remained for four weeks until it left the chart three weeks later. The song peaked at number nine for two consecutive weeks, after spending 10 weeks on the chart in Spain.

Music video

The music video for "Manos al Aire" was filmed in June 2009 in Toronto and premiered on July 29, 2009. It was released to Apple's iTunes Store on August 3, 2009. In the beginning of the video, Furtado is shown driving an army jeep and sporting army gear, all of which she said represents her character's strong ego. As the video progresses, Furtado is shown throwing items and personal belongings out of the Army truck. These belongings are symbolized as her "emotional" weapons. In another scene, Furtado departs from the truck, and begins walking down a street. She also begins shedding her army gear and getting rid of her purse and other articles of clothing, all of which symbolizes letting her guard and defenses down. As the video comes to a conclusion, Furtado, who is vulnerable, shows up to her boyfriend's frontdoor, who greets her with the same defenseless attitude. Per Furtado's request, the video features English subtitles for viewers. The lyrics in the English subtitles for the video are not literal translations, they are an English interpretation of the song, which Furtado herself had written.

Track listing
 German 2-track single
"Manos al Aire" — 3:28
"Manos al Aire" (Robbie Rivera Radio Mix) — 3:35

 German 4-track single
 "Manos al Aire" — 3:28
 "Manos al Aire" (Robbie Rivera Radio Mix) — 3:35
 "Manos al Aire" (Robbie Rivera Juicy Mix) — 7:07
 "Manos al Aire" (Robbie Rivera Radio Mix Instrumental) — 3:33

Personnel
Credits are adapted from the Mi Plan liner notes.

Nelly Furtado – producer
James Bryan – producer, recording engineer, drum programming, guitars, keyboards
Demacio "Demo" Castellón – mixing
Dan Warner – additional guitar, bass
The Demolition Crew – co-producer

Michael Anthony – additional drum programming
Nick Banns – string arrangements
Daniel Stone – percussion
Jason "Metal" Donkersgoed – assistant mixing
Ron Taylor – digital editing
Chris Gerhinger – mastering

Charts

Weekly charts

Year-end charts

Certifications

Radio and release dates

See also
 List of number-one Billboard Hot Latin Songs of 2009

References

2009 singles
Nelly Furtado songs
Spanish-language songs
Songs written by Nelly Furtado
Songs written by Alex Cuba
Music videos directed by Director X
Universal Music Latino singles
2009 songs
Songs written by James Bryan McCollum